The Museum of Shan Sawbwa is a history museum dedicated to the former Shan Chief of Yawnghwe Sao Shwe Thaik, as well as to other rulers of Shan states. It is located in Nandawon Ward, Nyaung Shwe, Shan State in Burma. 

It display costumes of Shan Sawbwa, their utensils and furniture, religious material, manuscripts, lacquer-wares, as well as historical records of Shan States.

See also
Shan State Cultural Museum

References

Museums in Myanmar
Buildings and structures in Shan State